The Barratta Creek is a creek located in North Queensland, Australia.

The headwaters of the creek rise below Bunkers Hill in the Leichhardt Range in the Great Dividing Range and flow in a north easterly direction. The creek continues through mostly uninhabited country past Woodhouse Mountain travelling almost parallel with the Haughton River eventually crossing the Bruce Highway and entering the Bowling Green Bay Conservation Park then discharging into Bowling Green Bay near Jerona, before flowing into the Coral Sea. The river descends  over its  course.

The riparian habitat of the catchment, particularly the northern end, has declined since the 1970s as a result of clearing of the floodplain forest to plant sugarcane. Most of the catchment area is still used for pastoralism, particularly grazing land for cattle.

The name of the creek is thought to be derived from the local Aboriginal dialect from the name for a chain of lagoons found in the area.

See also

References

Rivers of Queensland
North Queensland
Bodies of water of the Coral Sea